The Rose Theatre is an arts venue and Category B listed building on Rose Street, Edinburgh, Scotland, owned by ballet dancer and Olivier Award winning director Peter Schaufuss and is as a year round venue for theatre, comedy, music, dance and cabaret. It is also the home of the Rose Theatre Cafe. The venue is playing a major role during the Edinburgh Festival Fringe.

History

The building was opened as a church in 1912 with seating for exactly 1,000 people. It was built, on the site of an earlier pedimented 18th century chapel, at a cost of £7,250 for a long-standing Baptist congregation which had been established by theologian Christopher Anderson in January 1808. The architects were J A Arnott and J Inch Morrison. The building was listed on 28 March 1996.

In 2012, the congregation bought the former St George's West Church of Scotland building in Shandwick Place for £1.55m. Senior pastor, Rev Paul Rees, said the Rose Street building was not fit for the congregation's needs while the Shandwick Place building gave them a larger and more flexible space.

In 2014, an application was made to convert the building to a 'superpub', but this was refused by City of Edinburgh Council. In 2016, a new application by Glendola Leisure Ltd, to turn the building into a restaurant, bar and hotel was also rejected. 

However, a different plan of a £1.8m development of a new theatre and performing arts centre by Danish ballet dancer and Olivier Award winning director Peter Schaufuss was accepted. The converted building features 5 performance spaces, including a 340 seat main hall, a basement space for 130, a Cabaret Bar for 300, a 100 seat studio, and an attic with a capacity of 50. It opened at the 2017 Edinburgh Festival Fringe, programmed by Gilded Balloon who put on a mixed bill of 40 productions, including comedian Craig Ferguson. Shortly after that initial Fringe, Gilded Balloon announced a year round programme, including theatre in the main hall and comedy in the basement.

In 2018 the Rose Theatre Cafe opened winning 3 awards. The following year in 2019 the venue, became the home of the MGA Academy Scotlands major theatre school during the day hours, with the theatres venues operating year round performances in the evening and weekends.

In 2020 the theatre was closed because of the Covid pandemic, however the Rose Theatre Cafe managed to stay open observing government rules.

In 2021 a new refurbished Rose Theatre Basement venue is to open. In the main venue a Nutcracker by the newly formed Edinburgh Festival Ballet is planned for December.

Design

The building is a four storey, five bay stripped Wrenaissance chapel and meeting halls, built of polished sandstone ashlar, with harled secondary elevations.

References

External links
 Rose Theatre website
 Listing on Canmore

Theatres in Edinburgh